Ante Bakmaz (born 7 March 1992) is an Australian professional footballer who plays as a centre-back for  Sydney United 58. Born in Australia, Bakmaz is of Croatian descent.

Early life
Born in the suburbs of Sydney, Australia, Bakmaz moved to his country of origin, Croatia, after completing his studies in 2013.

Club career

Early career
Starting his career in Australia, Bakmaz moved to Croatia in 2013. He played first for NK Trešnjevka, and then for NK Laduč in 2014, before moving to Amsterdam, Netherlands in 2015. He joined Dutch side Chabab, before moving to Ajax. He would, however, only play for the reserve teams.

Latvia and Lithuania
After the 2015–16 season, which left him injured and without a professional contract, Bakmaz moved to Maltese side St. Andrews in 2016. After six months, in 2017, he signed a one-year contract with Latvian club FK Jelgava. In January 2018, Bakmaz signed for FK Kauno Žalgiris in Lithuania, before moving back to Latvia, signing for Valmieras FK in the same year's summer transfer window.

Lebanon and Indonesia
In 2019, Bakmaz moved to Lebanese side Nejmeh to compete in the 2019 AFC Cup; he played in six games. On 1 September 2019, he joined Indonesian side Madura United. However, after 15 games in the Liga 1, the club announced that they would not renew his contract. On 9 February 2020, Bakmaz joined Persik Kediri.

Oman
As of 2021, Bakmaz is playing for Al Suwaiq in the Oman Professional League.

Personal life
Bakmaz can speak both English and Croatian.

References

External links

Ante Bakmaz at SportsTG.com

1992 births
Living people
Australian soccer players
Australian people of Croatian descent
Association football midfielders
Australian expatriate soccer players
Australian expatriate sportspeople in the Netherlands
Expatriate footballers in the Netherlands
Australian expatriate sportspeople in Malta
Expatriate footballers in Malta
Maltese Premier League players
St. Andrews F.C. players
Australian expatriate sportspeople in Latvia
Expatriate footballers in Latvia
Latvian Higher League players
FK Jelgava players
Australian expatriate sportspeople in Lithuania
Expatriate footballers in Lithuania
A Lyga players
FK Kauno Žalgiris players
Valmieras FK players
Australian expatriate sportspeople in Lebanon
Expatriate footballers in Lebanon
Nejmeh SC players
Australian expatriate sportspeople in Indonesia
Expatriate footballers in Indonesia
Indonesian Premier Division players
Madura United F.C. players
Persik Kediri players
Australian expatriate sportspeople in Romania
Expatriate footballers in Romania
Liga II players
CS Academica Recea players
Sydney United 58 FC players